Aillarehue or Ayllarehue (from the Mapudungun: ayllarewe/ayjarewe: "nine rehues"); a confederation of rehues or family-based units (lof) that dominated a region or province. It was the old administrative and territorial division of the Mapuche, Huilliche and the extinct Picunche people.  Aillarehue acted as a unit only on special festive, religious, political and especial military occasions. Several aillarehues formed the Butalmapu, the largest military and political organization of the Mapuche.

Etymology  
Each Mapuche lof, levo or caví (lineage) celebrated its religious rituals at a unique rehue or rewe ("altar"), near the home of a local lonko, Ulmen or cacique, often the word rehue was used with the sense of party or clan ("I am from this rehue"), in a way similar to the old form of Christian administrative allegiance to parishes.  Although aillarehue ment "nine altars" these confederations did not necessarily conform to this number of rehues.  
The name of many of these aillarehue confederations have remained in the present toponymy of the southern regions of Chile.

List of known Mapuche Butalmapu, their aillarehues and their known member rehues

Picunmapu 
Although it is known the Picunche had many aillarehues in the central zone of Chile, like those of Codegua, Vichuquén and Rapel most of their names are unknown. The following list is reconstructed from the listing of the aillarehues of the Moluche and Huilliche between the Itata River and Reloncaví Sound, due to the work of Ricardo E. Latcham in the 1920s.  Five Butalmapu were known to the Spanish at the beginning of the 18th century. Add to them the one in the region between the Itata and Bio Bio Rivers, that existed at the early part of the Conquest of Chile.  With this one six are known to have existed.  One is thought to have existed among the Picunche to the north of the Itata River, at the beginning of the conquest.  It is thought to have extended from the Limari to the Mataquito Rivers.  The Picunche of the region of the Maule River valley may have been a separate Butalmapu or an aillarehue allied with the Cauquenes aillarehue and aillarehue of the northern Moluche Butalmapu at the time of the Inca invasion of Chile and at the Battle of the Maule.

Butalmapu between the Itata and Bio Bio Rivers 
The Butalmapu of Moluche aillarehues located between the coast and the foothills of the Andes between the Itata River and Bio Bio River.
 Coelemu (Spanish name Gualemo) between the Itata River and Estero Bureo.
 Coelemu
 Otohue
 Coihueco
 Peguco (Spanish name Penco) between the Estero Bureo and Andalién Rivers.
 Talcahuenu
 Aquelpangue
 Arana
 Puchacay
 Andalién
 Rere on both sides of the Claro River
 Huelén-Huelén
 Cahuiñungue
 Guachumávida
 Talcamávida
 Hualqui to the north of the Bio Bio River, from Quilacoya River to the Pacific Ocean and south of the Andalién River.
 Laleufu
 Quilacoya
 Yecutun
 Hualqui or Gualque
 Talcahuenu
 Llancamilla (Spanish usually called it Llaucamilla) between the Itata River and the region near Los Ángeles, east of Rere.
 Tolmilla
 Quelenmapuco
 Rarinlevu between the Laja River and Bio Bio River east of Los Ángeles.
 (names of rehues unknown)

Lafkenmapu 
The Butalmapu of Moluche aillarehues located between the coast and the Nahuelbuta Range between the Bio Bio River and the Toltén River, (from north to south):
 Marihuenu between the Bio Bio and the Carampangue Rivers
 Neculhuenu
 Pailahuenu
 Topillanca
 Antuhuenu
 Colcura
 Marihuenu
 Huenurehue
 Chechelevo
 Conilevo
 Quiapeo
 Cahuinhuenu
 Arauco between the Carampangue and the Lebu Rivers
 Panguerehue
 Millarupue
 Llaghupai (Lavapie)
 Quidico
 Quiapo
 Levo (Lebu)
 Colico
 Arauco
 Andalicán
 Tucapel between the Lebu and the Lleulleu Rivers
 Molhuilli
 Lincoyan
 Pilmaiquén
 Tucapel
 Paicavi
 Ancalemu
 Thomelemu
 Cayucupil
 Ilicura
 Vutalevu
 Licanievu between the Lleulleu and the Tirua Rivers
 Chamacodo
 Lemolemo
 Villoto
 Colcuimo
 Relomo
 Pillurehue
 Vilurehue
 Provinco
 Licanlebu
 Tirua
 Ranquilhue between the Tirua and the Cautín Rivers
 Ranquilhue
 Quinahuel
 Pellahuenu
 Claroa
 Rangaloe
 Trevolhue
 Moncolhue
 Cautín between the Cautín and the Toltén Rivers
 Pelulcura
 Llamocavi
 Coyamrehue
 Celolebu
 Budi

Lelfünmapu 
The Butalmapu of Moluche aillarehues located in the Chilean Central Valley and between the Bio Bio River and the Toltén River:
 Catiray east of the Nahuelbuta Range to the Bio Bio River until Negete in the south.
 Pirenmavida
 Tavolevo
 Lincura
 Arumco
 Pilumrehue
 Curalevo
 Coyamco
 Quilalemu
 Gueche
 Chipimo
 Mayurehue
 Peterehue
 Namcurehue
 Millapoa
 Chacaico between the Huequén River and the Renaico River
 Chacaico
 Viluquen
 Purén major parts of the old Department of Angol and of Traiguén from the Nahuelbuta Range to the Rahue River.
 Guadava
 Purén
 Coyamcahuin
 Lumaco
 Tomelemu
 Coipolevo
 Picoiquen
 Engolmo
 Leborupu
 Voquilemu
 Rupucura located in both shores of the Cholchol River, from entrance of the Colpi River, to the Cautín River, and from the Cautin, from hills of Nielol to the Nahuelbuta Range.
 Nielol
 Rupucura
 Colpillan
 Voigueco
 Boroa south of the Cautin River between the Boroa and Quepe Rivers
 Boroa

Ina piremapu 
The Butalmapu of Moluche aillarehues located in the zone of the foothills of the Andes between the Bio Bio River and the Toltén River:
 Malven the old Department of Mulchen to the hills of Pemehue.
 Malven
 Rucalhue
 Quilaco
 Colhue between the rivers Renaico and Malleco.
 Colhue
 Quecherehue between the Huequén and Traiguén Rivers.
 Quecherehue
 Adencul
 Nupangue
 Quillahueque
 Quillinco between the Traiguén and Cautin Rivers
 Quillinco
 Maquehue between the Cautin and Quepe Rivers
 Maquehue
 Quincholco
 Chumilemo
 Puellocavi
 Alihueco
 Ailangue
 Purumen

Piren mapu 
The Butalmapu of Pehuenche aillarehues located in the zone of the Andes cordillera between the Itata and the Toltén Rivers:
 Quilcolco between the Duqueco and the Bio Bio Rivers
 Mincoya
 Coquilpoco
 Otarachina
 Iguamamilla
 Iguandepirén
 Inaculicán
 Maricaiveo
 Alcanhuere
 Calvulicán
 Millanaliuél
 Chancanahuél
Rucalhue, between the valley of the Bio Bio, in the vicinity of Santa Bárbara
 Marupu
 Memacoiputuongo
 Tililco
 Queuco
 Callaqui in the same valley in the vicinity of the Callaque volcano.
 Lolco from Callaque to Lonquimay.
 Liucura from Lonquimay to Gualletué.
 Huenchulafquén, the vicinity of lake Huenchulafquén.

Willimapu 
The Butalmapu of Huilliche and Cuncos aillarehues located in between the Toltén River and the Bueno River:
 Maricünga or Mariquina located in plain on both banks of the Cruces River.
 Marileufu
 Chonqui
 Rucaraque
 Chedque geographic location unknown
 Huenuhue or Guanehue vicinity of Panguipulli Lake.
 Pidhuinco geographic location unknown
 Arique, to the south of the Calle-Calle River to the Callileufu River.
 Naghtoltén south of the Toltén River, between the sea and the Donquill River.
 Quele to the south of Naghtoltén, from the coast, contiguous with the Maricüga River.
 Coipolavquén
 Huelchehue
 Huadalafquén from the north bank of the Calle-Calle River to the coast, bounded on the north by Maricüga.
 Lucone
 Popalán
 Pocotí
 Calle Calle
 Piden
 Riñihue in the region of Riñihue Lake
 Quinchilca to the west of Riñihue and on both sides of the Quinchilca River.
 Collico, between the Calle Calle and Futa Rivers.
 Cudico, the region between the Futa River and the sea.
 Sepilloa
 Colleco
 Lepilmapu
 Daghlipulli, to the east of Cudico.
 Quechurehue, between the Allipén River and Villarrica Lake.
 Ranco, in the region of Ranco Lake.

Chawra kawin 
The Butalmapu of Huilliche and Cuncos aillarehues located between the Bueno River and the Reloncaví Sound:
 Coihueco south of Osorno, Chile.
 Cunco on the coast before Llanquihue Lake.
 Quilacahuín, between the Rahue River and the sea.
 Trumao to the north of Quilacahuín, on the South bank of the Bueno River.
 Lipihue, to the southwest of Llanquihue lake.
 Lepilmapu, between the Llico River and the Maullín River.
 Carelmapu, to the south of the Maullín River.
 Calbuco, to the east of Carelmapu.

References

Sources 
  Juan Ignatius Molina, The Geographical, Natural, and Civil History of Chili, Longman, Hurst, Rees, and Orme, London, 1809
 Ricardo E. Latcham,  La organización social y las creencias religiosas de los antiguos araucanos, Santiago de Chile, Impr. Cervantes, 1924.

Mapuche regions
Social history of Chile